Crime Story is a British true crime drama anthology television series, first broadcast on 18 September 1992 on ITV. Two series were produced between 1992 and 1995, containing a total of fifteen episodes. Each episode depicts the events leading up to and encompassing a notable true crime, including cases such as the Erwin Van Haarlem mystery and the Teacup Poisoner murders.

The series is notable for including the first television script written by BAFTA-award-winning writer Jeff Pope. Neither series has been released on DVD.

Episodes

Note: The 15 episodes are numbered differently on IMDB.com (below) vs. Britbox streaming channel

Series 1 (1992)

Series 2 (1993–1995)

References

External links

1992 British television series debuts
1995 British television series endings
1990s British crime television series
1990s British drama television series
1990s British anthology television series
1990s British television miniseries
Television series by ITV Studios
English-language television shows
Carlton Television
Television shows produced by Central Independent Television
Television shows produced by Granada Television
Television shows produced by Harlech Television (HTV)
London Weekend Television shows
Television shows produced by Scottish Television
Television shows produced by Television South (TVS)
Television shows produced by Tyne Tees Television
Television shows set in the United Kingdom